Amarillo Independent School District is a school district that is based in the city of Amarillo, Texas, United States. In the 2009-2010 academic term, nearly 32,000 students were enrolled.

Finances
As of the 2010-2011 school year, the appraised valuation of property in the district was $7,244,290,000. The maintenance tax rate was $0.108 and the bond tax rate was $0.009 per $100 of appraised valuation.

Academic achievement
In 2011, the school district was rated "academically acceptable" by the Texas Education Agency.  Forty-nine percent of districts in Texas in 2011 received the same rating. No state accountability ratings will be given to districts in 2012. A school district in Texas can receive one of four possible rankings from the Texas Education Agency: Exemplary (the highest possible ranking), Recognized, Academically Acceptable, and Academically Unacceptable (the lowest possible ranking).

Historical district TEA accountability ratings
2011: Academically Acceptable
2010: Recognized
2009: Academically Acceptable
2008: Academically Acceptable
2007: Academically Acceptable
2006: Academically Acceptable
2005: Academically Acceptable
2004: Academically Acceptable

List of schools

High schools 
Amarillo High School
Caprock High School
Palo Duro High School
Tascosa High School

Specialized instruction 
AmTech Career Academy (AACAL)
Homebound
North Heights Alternative

Middle schools 
Austin Middle School
Bonham Middle School
1999-2000 National Blue Ribbon School
Bowie Middle School
Bowie 6th Grade Campus
Crockett Middle School
1994-96 National Blue Ribbon School
Lorenzo de Zavala Middle School (includes grades 5,6,7&8)
Fannin Middle School
Houston Middle School
Johnny N. Allen (6th Grade Only)
Mann Middle School
Travis Middle School
Travis 6th Grade Campus

Elementary schools 
Avondale Elementary
Belmar Elementary
Bivins Elementary
2008 National Blue Ribbon School
Carver Early Childhood Academy
Carver Elementary Academy
Coronado Elementary
Eastridge Elementary
Emerson Elementary
Forest Hill Elementary
Glenwood Elementary
Hamlet Elementary School
Humphrey's Highland Elementary
Lamar Elementary
Olsen Park Elementary
Paramount Terrace Elementary
Pleasant Valley Elementary
2006 National Blue Ribbon School
Puckett Elementary
Ridgecrest Elementary
Rogers Elementary
San Jacinto Elementary
Sanborn Elementary
Sleepy Hollow Elementary
2006 National Blue Ribbon School
South Georgia Elementary
South Lawn Elementary
Sunrise Elementary
2005 National Blue Ribbon School
Tradewind Elementary
Western Plateau Elementary
Whittier Elementary
2017 [National Blue Ribbon School]
Wills Elementary
Windsor Elementary
Wolflin Elementary
Woodlands Elementary
2005 National Blue Ribbon School

See also 

List of school districts in Texas
List of high schools in Texas

References

External links 
 Official site

 
School districts in Texas